"Even the Bad Times Are Good" is a song written by British group the Tremeloes, released as a single in July 1967. It became their third consecutive top-ten hit in the UK and continued their international success.

Release and reception
"Even the Bad Times Are Good" was written by songwriting duo Peter Callander and Mitch Murray. The song was a contender for Sandie Shaw to sing at the Eurovision Song Contest 1967; however, it lost out to the eventual Eurovision winner "Puppet on a String". After this, the song was quickly picked up by the Tremeloes who first released their version in May 1967 on their album Here Comes the Tremeloes. Following the number-one success of "Silence Is Golden", "Even the Bad Times Are Good" was released as a single with the B-side, "Jenny's Alright", written by the Tremeloes' Len "Chip" Hawkes and Alan Blakley.

Reviewing for Disc and Music Echo, Penny Valentine described the song as "another saga of simplicity and drum-thumping much in the vein of "Here Comes My Baby". For one moment at the beginning when everyone broke into extraordinary cackling I had my doubts and wondered if the Tremeloes were about to freak out. But ah, no, here we go, lads – thump, bang, crash, wallop".

Track listings
7": CBS / 2930 (UK)
 "Even the Bad Times Are Good" – 2:36
 "Jenny's Alright" – 2:24

7": Epic / 5-10233 (US and Canada)
 "Even the Bad Times Are Good" – 2:24
 "Jenny's All Right" – 2:22

Charts

References

1967 singles
1967 songs
The Tremeloes songs
Songs written by Peter Callander
Songs written by Mitch Murray
CBS Records singles
Epic Records singles
Song recordings produced by Mike Smith (British record producer)